Launaea nudicaulis, known by the common English name of bold-leaf launaea, is a species of plant which is endemic to India, as well the Negev and Judean desert. In India it is known under a common name bhatal and is found in Hazara, Mansehra, Multan, Rawalpindi and Scinde districts of Punjab and Lahore.

References

Flora of India (region)
nudicaulis